Rukkan is a village of Mandi Bahauddin District, Punjab, Pakistan. It is away from District Mandi Bahauddin up to 31 km and 17 km from Tehsil Malakwal and 4 km from Gojra.

Population 
It is not a very big village only about 10,000 houses are in it and about 50,000 peoples live in them. All the population of the village is Muslim among them all are SUNNY except one house that is of SHIA. No non-muslim is there in the village.

References 
https://mbdin.com/rukkan/